The 31st House of Representatives of Puerto Rico is the lower house of the 19th Legislative Assembly of Puerto Rico and will meet from January 2, 2021 to January 1, 2025. All members were elected in the 2020 elections. The House had a majority of elected members from the Popular Democratic Party (PPD), but since 4 May 2022 the PPD only enjoys a plurality.

The body is counterparted by the 27th Senate of Puerto Rico in the upper house.

Composition

Leadership

Non-officers

Members
The following is a list of current members of the House of Representatives. Néstor A. Alonso Vega resigned from his position after being charged for corruption by federal prosecutors days after the general election, and a special election was held on 21 March 2021 to select his successor from within the New Progressive Party. In addition, while Luis Raúl Torres Cruz was elected under the PPD banner, due to differences with decisions of the party's delegation leadership on policy areas under his purview, on 4 May 2022 Torres Cruz distanced himself from the party, became an independent, and said this move was "final and irrevocable".

Changes in membership
 21 March 2021: José Pérez Cordero is sworn in substitution of fellow New Progressive Néstor A. Alonso Vega, after securing victory a special closed party election.
 4 May 2022: Luis Raúl Torres Cruz switches from being a Popular Democratic Party representative to Independent due to differences with party leadership.

Commissions

Standing commissions

! scope=col style="text-align: left" | Standing Commission Name
! scope=col style="text-align: left" | President
! scope=col style="text-align: left" | Vice President
! scope=col style="text-align: left" | Secretary
|-
| Calendars and Special Rules of Debate
| Ángel Matos García
| Roberto Rivera Ruiz de Porras
| José Conny Varela Fernández
|-
| Agriculture
| Jorge Alfredo Rivera Segarra
| Eladio Cardona Quiles
| José Rivera Madera
|-
| Anti-corruption and Public Integrity
| Héctor E. Ferrer Santiago
| Deborah Soto Arroyo
| Ángel A. Fourquet Cordero
|-
| Women's Affairs
| Jocelyne M. Rodríguez Negrón
| Estrella Martínez Soto
| Sol Y. Higgins Cuadrado
|-
| Youth Affairs
| Héctor Ferrer Santiago
| Jocelyne M. Rodríguez Negrón
| Juan J. Santiago Nieves
|-
| Internal Affairs of the House of Representatives
| Roberto Rivera Ruiz de Porras
| Luis Raúl Torres Cruz
| Deborah Soto Arroyo
|-
| Labor Affairs and Pension Reforms
| Domingo J. Torres García
| José H. Rivera Madera
| Deborah Soto Arroyo
|-
| Municipal Autonomy, Decentralization, and Regionalization
| Juan José Santiago Nieves
| Jessie Cortés Ramos
| Jocelyn Rodríguez Negrón
|-
| Social Welfare, Persons with Disabilities and the Elderly
| Lisie J. Burgos Muñiz
| Edgardo Feliciano Sánchez
| Deborah Soto Arroyo
|-
| Economic Development, Planning, Telecommunications, Public-Private Partnerships and Energy
| Luis Raúl Torres Cruz
| Jesús Santa Rodríguez
| Orlando Aponte Rosario
|-
| Education, Art and Culture
| Deborah Soto Arroyo
| Kebin A. Maldonado Martiz
| Sol Y. Higgins Cuadrado
|-
| Ethics
| Ángel Matos García
| Ángel A. Fourquet Cordero
| Deborah Soto Arroyo
|-
| Oversight of Public Funds
| Ángel A. Fourquet Cordero
| Ramón Luis Cruz Burgos
| Juan J. Santiago Nieves
|-
| Government
| Jesús Manuel Ortiz González
| Luis «Narmito» Ortiz Lugo
| Luis Raúl Torres Cruz
|-
| Finance and Budget
| Jesús Santa Rodríguez
| Luis Raúl Torres Cruz
| Luis «Narmito» Ortiz Lugo
|-
| Community Impact
| Lydia Méndez Silva
| Sol Y. Higgins Cuadrado
| Jocelyne M. Rodríguez Negrón
|-
| Judiciary
| Rafael "Tatito" Hernández Montañez (interim)
| Ángel Fourquet Cordero
| Jesús Manuel Ortiz González
|-
| Small and Medium Enterprises and Permits
| Jessie Cortés Ramos
| José H. Rivera Madera
| Domingo J. Torres García
|-
| Sports and Recreation
| Eladio J. Cardona Sánchez
| Jocelyne M. Rodríguez Negrón
| Estrella Martínez Soto
|-
| Natural Resources, Environmental Affairs, and Recycling
| Edgardo Feliciano Sánchez
| Kebin A. Maldonado Martiz
| Héctor E. Ferrer Santiago
|-
| Federal, International, Status, and Veterans Relations
| Kebin A. Maldonado Martiz
| Juan J. Santiago Nieves
| Jesús Santa Rodríguez
|-
| Health
| Sol Y. Higgins Cuadrado
| Luis Raúl Torres Cruz
| Kebin A. Maldonado Martiz
|-
| Public Security, Science and Technology
| Luis «Narmito» Ortiz Lugo
| José A. Díaz Collazo
| Jesús M. Ortiz González
|-
| Transportation, Infrastructure, and Public Works
| José A. Díaz Collazo
| Luis «Narmito» Ortiz Lugo
| Jesús Santa Rodríguez
|-
| Cooperatives and Tourism
| José H. Rivera Madera
| Héctor E. Ferrer Santiago
| Edgardo Feliciano Sánchez
|-
| Housing and Urban Development
| Ángel Fourquet Cordero
| Domingo Torres García
| José H. Rivera Madera
|-
| Development and Oversight of Public Funds for the Capital City, Aguas Buenas, Bayamón, Cataño and Guaynabo
| Luis Raúl Torres Cruz
| Héctor E. Ferrer Santiago
| Jesús M. Ortiz González
|-
| Oversight of Development Funds for the East Region
| Angel R. Peña Ramírez
| Sol Y. Higgins Cuadrado
| Luis «Narmito» Ortiz Lugo
|-
| Oversight of Development Funds for the Northeast Region
| Ángel Matos García
| Sol Y. Higgins Cuadrado
| Héctor E. Ferrer Santiago
|-
| Oversight of Development Funds for the Northwest Region
| José O. González Mercado
| Jessie Cortés Ramos
| Eladio J. Cardona Sánchez
|-
| Oversight of Development Funds for the North Region
| Edgardo Feliciano Sánchez
| Deborah Soto Arroyo
| Juan J. Santiago Nieves
|-
| Oversight of Development Funds for the West Region
| Jocelyn Rodríguez Negrón
| Kebin A. Maldonado Martiz
| Jessie Cortés Ramos
|-
| Oversight of Development Funds for the South Central Region
| Estrella Martínez Soto
| Jorge A. Rivera Segarra
| Orlando Aponte Rosario
|-
| Oversight of Development Funds for the Southeast Region
| Luis «Narmito» Ortiz Lugo
| José A. Díaz Collazo
| Ramón Luis Cruz Burgos
|-
| Oversight of Development Funds for the Southwest Region
| Ángel A. Fourquet Lamb
| José H. Rivera Madera
| Kebin A. Maldonado Martiz
|-
| Constitutional Amendments and Electoral Law
| José «Conny» Varela Fernández
| Jesús M. Ortiz González
| Orlando Aponte Rosario
|-
| Emergency Preparedness, Reconstruction and Reorganization
| Luis «Narmito» Ortiz Lugo
| José A. Díaz Collazo
| Ramón Luis Cruz Burgos
|-
| Consumer Rights, Banking Services and Insurance Industry
| Estrella Martínez Soto
| Orlando Aponte Rosario
| José H. Rivera Madera
|-

Joint commissions

! scope=col style="text-align: left" | Name
! scope=col style="text-align: left" | President
! scope=col style="text-align: left" | Vice President
! scope=col style="text-align: left" | Secretary
|-
| Review and Implementation of Administrative Regulations
| Tatito Hernández Montañez
| Jesús Santa Rodríguez
| José «Conny» Varela Fernández
|-
| Continuous Revision of the Penal Code and for the Reform of Criminal Laws
| Orlando Aponte Rosario
| Ángel A. Fourquet Cordero
| Jesús M. Ortiz González
|-
| Revision and Reform of the Civil Code
| Orlando Aponte Rosario
| Ángel A. Fourquet Cordero
| Jesús M. Ortiz González
|-
| Mitigation, Adaptation and Resilience to Climate Change
| Edgardo Feliciano Sánchez
| Kebin Maldonado Martiz
| Héctor Ferrer Santiago
|-
| Legislative Funding for Community Impact
| Jesús Santa Rodríguez
| Ángel A. Fourquet Cordero
| Juan J. Santiago Nieves
|-
| Public-Private Partnerships of Puerto Rico
| Luis Raúl Torres Cruz
| Jesús Santa Rodríguez
| Orlando Aponte Rosario
|-
| Special Reports from the Comptroller
| Tatito Hernández Montañez
| Roberto Rivera Ruiz de Porras
| Domingo J. Torres García
|-
| Córdova y Fernós Program of Congressional Internships
| Héctor Ferrer Santiago
| Deborah Soto Arroyo
| Ángel A. Fourquet Cordero
|-
| Pilar Barbosa Program of Education Internships
| Deborah Soto Arroyo
| Kebin A. Maldonado Martiz
| Lydia Méndez Silva
|-
| Jorge A. Ramos Comas Legislative Internship Program
| Héctor Ferrer Santiago
| Angel Matos García
| Lisie J. Burgos Muñiz
|-

Changes in leadership
 15 November 2022: Orlando Aponte Rosario is removed from the Presidency of the Judiciary Committee by Speaker Rafael "Tatito" Hernández Montañez. Hernández Montañez will be interim president of the committee.

References

External links
 tucamarapr.org - official site 
 Camara.PR.gov - another official site 

2021 in Puerto Rico
31